Flora was built in India. She first appeared in British records in 1801 as a West Indiaman. She was last listed in Lloyd's Register  (LR) in 1813.

Career
Flora first appeared in LRin 1801.

Captain Andrew Grant acquired a letter of marque on 24 August 1803.

Fate
Flora was last listed in Lloyd's Register 1813.

Citations and references
Citations

References
 

1800s ships
British ships built in India
Age of Sail merchant ships of England